John Mallory Asher (born John Mallory, January 13, 1971) is an American actor, film director and screenwriter. He is perhaps best known for his performance as Gary on the USA Network's series spinoff of the movie Weird Science.

Early life
Asher was born John Mallory to actor Edward Mallory and actress Joyce Bulifant. He was adopted by Bulifant's third husband, producer/director William Asher.

Personal life
Asher married actress Jenny McCarthy on September 11, 1999. Their son Evan Joseph Asher was born on May 18, 2002, and was diagnosed with autism. They divorced in September 2005.

Filmography

Actor
 Ghost Whisperer as Charlie Hammond
 October Road
 "Revenge of the Cupcake Kid" (2008), TV episode, as Ronald Buckwild
 CSI: Crime Scene Investigation
 "The Chick Chop Flick Shop" (2007), TV episode, as Zack Putrid
 NCIS
 "The Ex-File" (2007), TV episode, as Fred Rinnert
 Las Vegas
 "You Can't Take It with You" (2004), TV episode, as Calvin 'Doc' Haynes
 Fastlane
 "Dogtown" (2003), TV episode, as Shane
 Rubbing Charlie (2003), TV, as  Dean
 Going to California (2001), TV series, as Insect Bob
 Space Cowboys (2000) as Young Jerry (as John Mallory Asher)
 The New Swiss Family Robinson (1998) as Shane Robinson
 Gun
 "The Shot" (1997), TV episode, as The Video Rat
 Time Well Spent (1996) (TV) (as John Mallory Asher)
 Weird Science, TV series, as Gary Wallace
 Double Dragon (1994) as Smartass Mohawk
 Showdown (1993/I) as Mike
 Step by Step
 "The Making of the President" (1992), TV episode, as Student
 Frozen Assets (1992) as Bobby Murdock
 Who's the Boss?
 "Field of Screams" (1991), TV episode, as Usher
 Designing Women
 "Julia and Rusty, Sittin' in a Tree" (1991), TV episode, as Dennis
 The Hunted (1991) (TV) as Joe
 Married... with Children"
 "You Better Shop Around: Part 1" (1991), TV episode, as Bob
 Beverly Hills, 90210
 "Class of Beverly Hills" (1990), TV episode, as Guy in Hall

Director
 A Boy Called Po (2016)
 Tooken (2015)
 Somebody Marry Me (2013)
 One Tree Hill (as John Asher)
 "Who Will Survive, and What Will Be Left of Them" (2006) TV Episode 
 "Brave New World" (2006) TV Episode
 "The Worst Day Since Yesterday" (2005) TV Episode
 "The Trick Is to Keep Breathing" (2004) TV Episode 
 Thank Heaven (2006)
 Dirty Love (2005) (as John Asher)
 The Policy (2003/II) (as John Asher)
 Going to California (2001) TV Series
 Diamonds (1999)
 Chick Flick (1998) 
 Kounterfeit (1996) (as John Mallory Asher)

Producer
 Dirty Love (2005) (as John Mallory Asher)

Cinematographer
 Mating Rituals 101 (2004)

Writer
 Tooken (2015) 
 Chick Flick (1998)

References

External links
 
 

1971 births
American male film actors
American male television actors
American television directors
Living people
McCarthy family